Juan Ángel Iglesias Marcelo (1 March 1931 – 1 February 2022) was a Spanish politician. A member of the Spanish Socialist Workers' Party, he served in the Senate of Spain from 1979 to 1987 and was mayor of Cáceres from 1983 to 1987. He died in Cáceres on 1 February 2022, at the age of 90.

References

1931 births
2022 deaths
Members of the Senate of Spain
Mayors of places in Extremadura
People from Cáceres, Spain
Spanish Socialist Workers' Party politicians
Spanish academics
Deaths from multiple organ failure
Members of the 2nd Senate of Spain
Members of the 3rd Senate of Spain
Members of the 4th Senate of Spain
Members of the 5th Senate of Spain
Members of the 6th Senate of Spain
Commanders of the Order of Alfonso X, the Wise
Politicians from Extremadura